Jilin Baijia Football Club was a football club based in Changchun, Jilin, China.

History
Changchun Baihe F.C. was founded on March 11, 2011 by Changchun Baihe Construction Co. Ltd.. It participated in local amateur leagues in the city of Changchun until January 19, 2016, when it was merged with another local team, Changchun Caliux (founded on May 1, 2014 by Changchun Caliux Lubricant Co. Ltd.), and was rebranded as a professional team named Jilin Baijia, with its name being the combination of the first characters of its two patron companies' Chinese name. They participated in the 2016 China Amateur Football League and advanced to the final play-off stage, when they lost to Shaanxi Chang'an Athletic 5–6 in penalty shootout in the quarterfinals, suffering a bitter defeat as they watched their opponents celebrate their promotion to China League Two. However, they were later admitted into 2017 China League Two to fill in a spot left by withdrawn team Jingtie Locomotive F.C.

Jilin Baijia failed to participate in the 2020 China League Two season due to its failure to submit the confirmation form of salaries and bonuses from 2019 on time.

Name history
2011–2015 Changchun Baihe F.C. 长春百和
2016–2020 Jilin Baijia F.C. 吉林百嘉

Managerial history
  Li Bin (2016)
  Zoran Kitanoski (2017–2020)

Results
All-time league rankings

As of the end of 2019 season.

 In group stage.

Key
 Pld = Played
 W = Games won
 D = Games drawn
 L = Games lost
 F = Goals for
 A = Goals against
 Pts = Points
 Pos = Final position

 DNQ = Did not qualify
 DNE = Did not enter
 NH = Not Held
 – = Does Not Exist
 R1 = Round 1
 R2 = Round 2
 R3 = Round 3
 R4 = Round 4

 F = Final
 SF = Semi-finals
 QF = Quarter-finals
 R16 = Round of 16
 Group = Group stage
 GS2 = Second Group stage
 QR1 = First Qualifying Round
 QR2 = Second Qualifying Round
 QR3 = Third Qualifying Round

References

Football clubs in China
Association football clubs established in 2015
2015 establishments in China
2020 disestablishments in China
Association football clubs disestablished in 2020